Boris Fenster (17 April 1916 – 29 December 1960) was a Soviet dancer, choreographer and ballet master.

Fenster was born in Petrograd. He attended the Leningrad Ballet School and graduated in 1936. Fenster then joined the Maly Theatre Ballet and served as head choreographer from 1945-53. After leaving that post he joined the Kirov Ballet, becoming the artistic director in 1956. Fenster remained at the Kirov until his death. He died at the premiere of his ballet Maskerade.

See also
 List of Russian ballet dancers

References 

1916 births
1960 deaths
Mariinsky Ballet dancers
Soviet male ballet dancers
Ballet choreographers
Ballet masters
Burials at Serafimovskoe Cemetery